This is a list of regions of Saudi Arabia by Human Development Index as of 2023 with data for the year 2021.

See also 

 List of countries by Human Development Index

References 

Human Development Index
Saudi Arabia
Saudi Arabia